Johan Åkerman (born November 20, 1972) is a retired professional Swedish ice hockey player. He is currently a part of the coaching staff in the Linköpings HC organization.

References

External links

1972 births
Living people
AIK IF players
Expatriate ice hockey players in Russia
HC Lugano players
HV71 players
Linköping HC players
Lokomotiv Yaroslavl players
Skellefteå AIK players
Swedish expatriate sportspeople in Norway
Swedish expatriate sportspeople in Russia
Swedish expatriate sportspeople in Switzerland
Swedish ice hockey defencemen
Vålerenga Ishockey players
Hammarby Hockey (1921–2008) players
Ice hockey people from Stockholm